Frank Doran (13 April 1949 – 31 October 2017) was a Labour Party politician in the United Kingdom, who was the Member of Parliament (MP) for Aberdeen South from 1987 to 1992, when he lost his seat. He was re-elected in 1997 to Aberdeen Central, and most recently represented Aberdeen North. He was the husband of former Labour MP Dame Joan Ruddock.

He announced he would be standing down in 2015, saying "I don’t want to be wandering around here as a skeleton...I think that we need to allow younger people to come through.”

Education and early career
Doran attended the Ainslie Park Secondary School (later the Ainslie Park High School) in East Pilton and Leith Academy in Leith before leaving school at age 16. He took a job at the North of Scotland Hydro-Electric Board and was promoted to junior clerk in the legal department within a year. There, he was encouraged in his interest in law by Assistant Secretary of the Board Douglas Nellands, and he started taking night classes. After a few years, he attended the University of Dundee, where he was awarded a LLB degree in 1975. He was admitted as a solicitor in 1977 and was in practice until 1988.

Political career
He unsuccessfully contested the European Parliament seat of Scotland North East in 1984. He was elected to the House of Commons at the 1987 general election for Aberdeen South by defeating the sitting Conservative and Unionist MP Gerry Malone. He was promoted to the opposition frontbench by Neil Kinnock in 1988, as a spokesperson on energy, leading on oil and gas.

Doran lost the Aberdeen South seat at the 1992 general election by the Conservative and Unionist candidate Raymond Robertson. This was the only seat in which an incumbent Labour MP who stood for re-election lost to a Conservative candidate at that election. During his time out of Parliament, Doran was appointed by the Trade Unions to run the statutory political fund ballot campaign for the majority of Trade Unions who had political funds, until he was re-elected at the 1997 general election for the new constituency of Aberdeen Central.

He was appointed as the Parliamentary Private Secretary to the Minister of State at the Department of Trade and Industry Ian McCartney in 1997. He remained in position when McCartney transferred to the Cabinet Office in 1999, after which he became a member of the Culture, Media and Sport Select committee in 2001.

Following changes to the electoral boundaries in Scotland, the constituency of Aberdeen Central was abolished prior to the 2005 general election, Doran was forced to compete against the incumbent Aberdeen North MP, Malcolm Savidge, for the Labour Party candidacy in a much-altered Aberdeen North seat. Doran won the nomination, and was elected to represent the new Aberdeen North seat with a majority of 6,795 votes. The victory gave Frank Doran the unique distinction of having represented Aberdeen South, Aberdeen Central and Aberdeen North during his parliamentary career.

Doran was, on 20 July 2005, elected Chairman of the Administration Committee, and in this role he sat on the Finance and Services, Liaison and Works of Art committees. Doran served as Chairman until the end of the Parliament on 11 May 2010. He was Chairman of the Advisory Committee on Works of Art, the Secretary to the  All-Party Fisheries Group, the GMB Parliamentary Group, the Trade Union Group of Labour MPs, the All Party Dance Group, and he is also Treasurer of  All-Party Oil and Gas Group.

Votes
In March 2003, Doran voted that the case had not yet been made for war against Iraq. He voted against a motion calling for an independent inquiry by a committee of Privy Counsellors into the Iraq War in 2007.

He voted against the replacement of the Trident system.

He voted in favour of allowing both unmarried heterosexual and homosexual couples to adopt, in favour of the Civil Partnership Bill, and in favour of same-sex marriage.

Controversy of MP queue-jumping
Doran sparked outrage when the Administration Committee that he chaired ruled that researchers and secretaries working in the House of Commons must allow MPs to jump the queue for the canteen. Staffers described the rules as "feudal", and complained they were being treated as second-class citizens. Doran, however, said: "You cannot have an MP standing in a queue for ages: they are very busy people". He acknowledged that the way in which staff were told about the ruling may have been better handled.

Personal life
Doran had two sons from his first marriage. He married, secondly, to Dame Joan Ruddock, a Labour minister. from 2010 until his death.

Death
Frank Doran died on 31 October 2017 in London, aged 68.

References

External links
 Official Site 
 Frank Doran MP on TheyWorkForYou.com
 
 BBC Politics 

1949 births
2017 deaths
Alumni of the University of Dundee
People from Leith
Members of the Parliament of the United Kingdom for Aberdeen constituencies
Politicians from Edinburgh
Scottish solicitors
UK MPs 1987–1992
UK MPs 1997–2001
UK MPs 2001–2005
UK MPs 2005–2010
UK MPs 2010–2015
Scottish Labour MPs
People educated at Leith Academy
People educated at Ainslie Park High School
Spouses of British politicians